Sir Andrew Ewart McFarlane  (born 20 June 1954) is a British judge. He was a Lord Justice of Appeal in England and Wales from 2011 to 2018, and became President of the Family Division in July 2018 upon Sir James Munby’s retirement from that office.

Early life and education
McFarlane was brought up in Solihull, West Midlands, before moving to Crosby, Merseyside. He was educated at Shrewsbury School and studied law at Collingwood College, Durham, and graduated in 1975. He was an early member of Durham University Sensible Thespians (later renamed The Durham Revue), a sketch comedy group founded in 1973.

Legal career
McFarlane was called to the bar at Gray's Inn in 1977 and has been a Bencher since 2003. He began his pupillage in London at chancery chambers before moving to 2 Fountain Court in Birmingham (now St Philips Chambers). While there, he and David Hershman wrote Hershman and McFarlane: Children Law and Practice. He then moved to 1 King’s Bench Walk in Temple, London in 1994. In 1998, he became a Queen's Counsel.

He was appointed an Assistant Recorder in 1995, a Recorder in 1999 and a deputy High Court Judge in 2000. He was appointed as a judge of the High Court of Justice on 18 April 2005 and assigned to the Family Division, receiving the customary knighthood. McFarlane was the Family Division Liaison Judge for the Midland Circuit from 2006 until his appointment as a Lord Justice of Appeal on 28 July 2011, whereupon he received the customary appointment to the Privy Council. On  28 July 2018, he was appointed President of the Family Division.

He is the President of Tribunals and Chair of the Clergy Discipline Commission of the Church of England under the Clergy Discipline Measure 2003.

References

1954 births
Living people
People educated at Shrewsbury School
Alumni of Collingwood College, Durham
Family Division judges
Knights Bachelor
Members of the Privy Council of the United Kingdom
Lords Justices of Appeal
Presidents of the Family Division